Sipring Khola Hydropower Station (Nepali: सिप्रिन खोला जलविद्युत आयोजना) is a run-of-river hydro-electric plant located in  Dolakha District of Nepal. The flow from Sipring River, a tributary of Tamakoshi River, is used to generate 10 MW electricity. The design head is 443.7 m and the design flow is 2.61m3/s.

The plant is owned and developed by Synergy Power Development P Ltd , an IPP of Nepal. It started generating electricity from 2069-10-03 BS. The generation licence will expire in 2101-01-29 BS, after which the plant will be handed over to the government. The power station is connected to the national grid and the electricity is sold to Nepal Electricity Authority.

See also

Upper Tamakoshi Hydroelectric Project (456 MW station nearby)
List of power stations in Nepal

References

External links
Homepage

Hydroelectric power stations in Nepal
Gravity dams
Run-of-the-river power stations
Dams in Nepal
Irrigation in Nepal
Buildings and structures in Dolakha District